Sir Jadunath Sarkar  (10 December 1870 – 19 May 1958) was a prominent Indian historian and a specialist on the Mughal dynasty. 

Sarkar was educated in English literature, worked as a teacher for some period of time but later shifted his focus history research writing. 
He had vast knowledge of Persian language and all his books he wrote in English. He was vice chancellor (VC) of University of Calcutta from 1926–1928 a member of Bengal Legislative Council between 1929-1932. In 1929 British knighted him.

Academic career 
Sarkar was born in Karachmaria village in Natore, Bengal to Rajkumar Sarkar, the local Zamindar on 10 December 1870. In 1891, he graduated in English from Presidency College, Calcutta. In 1892, he topped the Master of Arts examination, in English at Calcutta University and in 1897, he received the Premchand-Roychand Scholarship.

In 1893, he was inducted as a faculty of English literature at Ripon College, Calcutta (later renamed Surendranath College). In 1898, he was appointed at Presidency College, Calcutta after getting selected in the Provincial Education Services. In between, from 1917 to 1919, he taught modern Indian history in Benaras Hindu University and from 1919 to 1923, both English and history, at Ravenshaw College, Cuttack. In 1923, he became an honorary member of the Royal Asiatic Society of London. In August 1926, he was appointed as the Vice Chancellor of Calcutta University. In 1928, he joined as Sir W. Meyer Lecturer in Madras University.

Historiography

Reception 
Sarkar's works faded out of public memory, with the increasing advent of Marxist and postcolonial schools of historiography.

Academically, Jos J. L. Gommans compares Sarkar's work with those of the Aligarh historians, noting that while the historians from the Aligarh worked mainly on the mansabdari system and gunpowder technology in the Mughal Empire, Sarkar concentrated on military tactics and sieges.

Honors 
Sarkar was honored by Britain with a Companion of the Order of the Indian Empire CIE and knighted in the 1929 Birthday Honours list. He was invested with his knighthood at Simla by the acting Viceroy, Lord Goschen, on 22 August 1929.

Legacy 
The Centre for Studies in Social Sciences, Calcutta, an autonomous research center, has been established in his house, which was donated to the state government by Sarkar's wife. CSSC also houses the Jadunath Bhavan Museum and Resource Centre, a museum-cum-archive of primary sources.

List of works 
Published works by Sarkar include:

 Economics of British India (1900)
 The India of Aurangzib (1901)
 Anecdotes of Aurangzib (1912)
 History of Aurangzib (in 5 volumes), (1912–24)
 Chaitanya's pilgrimages and teachings, from his contemporary Bengali biography, the Chaitanya-charit-amrita: Madhya-lila (translation from the Bengali original by Krishnadasa Kaviraja, 1913)
 Shivaji and his Times (1919)
 Studies in Mughal India (1919)
 Mughal Administration (1920)
 Nadir Shah in India (1922)
 Later Mughals by William Irvine (in 2 volumes), (edited by Jadunath Sarkar, 1922)
 India through the ages (1928)
 A Short History of Aurangzib (1930)
 The Fall of the Mughal Empire (in 4 volumes), (1932–38)
 Studies in Aurangzib's reign (1933)
 The House of Shivaji (1940)
 The History of Bengal (in 2 volumes), (1943–1948)
 Maāsir-i-ʻĀlamgiri: a history of the emperor Aurangzib-ʻl̀amgir (translation from the Persian original by Muḥammad Sāqī Mustaʻidd Khān, 1947)
 Military History of India (1960)
 A History of Jaipur, c. 1503–1938 (1984)
 A History Of Dasnami Naga Sanyasis

References

Sources

Further reading

External links

 
 Sir Sarkar at Britannica Encyclopedia
 
 

Presidency University, Kolkata alumni
Bengali historians
Bengali zamindars
Academic staff of Presidency University, Kolkata
Historians of South Asia
19th-century Indian historians
People from Natore District
Rajshahi College alumni
University of Calcutta alumni
Academic staff of the University of Calcutta
Vice Chancellors of the University of Calcutta
1870 births
1958 deaths
Knights Bachelor
Companions of the Order of the Indian Empire
Indian Knights Bachelor
20th-century Indian historians
Scholars from Kolkata